Ormetica rosenbergi is a moth of the family Erebidae. It was described by Walter Rothschild in 1909. It is found in Ecuador.

References

Ormetica
Moths described in 1909
Arctiinae of South America